The women's 1500 metres competition of the athletics events at the 2019 Pan American Games took place the 9 August at the 2019 Pan American Games Athletics Stadium. The defending Pan American Games champion is Muriel Coneo from Colombia.  Aisha Praught-Leer moved into marking position and that is the way the lead group held for the next lap and a half.

Summary
Alexa Efraimson took the lead from the gun into the first turn, then 200 meters into the race, defending champion Muriel Coneo moved into the lead.  On the penultimate backstretch, Praught moved past Coneo.  Nikki Hiltz used that cue to move from the back of the pack up to Efraimson's back, immediately behind Praught.  As they approached the bell, then around the turn, Hiltz moved around Efraimson and into a marking position on Praught's shoulder.  Cuneo tried to stay with the leaders until 200 to go when the top 3 made a break.  With 100 meters to go, Hiltz put on a burst of speed and the race was over.  Efraimson tried to catch Praught for silver, but couldn't make any progress.

Records
Prior to this competition, the existing world and Pan American Games records were as follows:

Schedule

Results
All times shown are in seconds.

Final
The results were as follows

References

Athletics at the 2019 Pan American Games
2019